is the permanent marking or "tattoo" as traditionally practised by Māori, the indigenous people of New Zealand. It is one of the five main Polynesian tattoo styles (the other four are Marquesan, Samoan, Tahitian and Hawaiian).

 (tattooists) were considered , or inviolable and sacred.

Historical practice (pre-contact)
Tattoo arts are common in the Eastern Polynesian homeland of the Māori people, and the traditional implements and methods employed were similar to those used in other parts of Polynesia. In pre-European Māori culture, many if not most high-ranking persons received . Moko were associated with mana and high social status; however, some very high-status individuals were considered too tapu to acquire moko, and it was also not considered suitable for some tohunga to do so. Receiving  constituted an important milestone between childhood and adulthood, and was accompanied by many rites and rituals. Apart from signalling status and rank, another reason for the practice in traditional times was to make a person more attractive to the opposite sex. Men generally received  on their faces, buttocks and thighs. Women usually wore moko on their lips and chins. Other parts of the body known to have moko include women's foreheads, buttocks, thighs, necks and backs and men's backs, stomachs, and calves.

Instruments used 

Later needle tattooing was used, but, in 2007, it was reported that the  currently was being used by some artists.

The soot from burnt kauri gum was also mixed with fat to make pigment. The pigment was stored in ornate vessels named , which were often buried when not in use. The  were handed on to successive generations. A  (feeding funnel) is believed to have been used to feed men whose mouths had become swollen from receiving .

Men and women were both tā moko specialists and would travel to perform their art.

Changes with European colonisation

Women continued receiving  through the early 20th century, and the historian Michael King in the early 1970s interviewed over 70 elderly women who would have been given the  before the 1907 Tohunga Suppression Act. Women's tattoos on lips and chin are commonly called pūkauae or moko kauae.

Contemporary practice
Women too have become more involved as practitioners, such as Christine Harvey in Christchurch, Henriata Nicholas in Rotorua and Julie Kipa in Whakatane. It is not the first time the contact with settlers has interfered with the tools of the trade: the earliest moko were engraved with bone and were replaced by metal supplied by the first visitors. The most significant change was the adjustment of the themes and conquests the tattoos represented. Tā moko artist Turumakina Duley, in an interview for Artonview magazine, shares his view on the transformation of the practice: “The difference in tā moko today as compared to the nineteenth century is in the change of lifestyle, in the way we live. […] The tradition of moko was one of initiation, rites of passage – it started around that age – but it also benchmarks achievements in your life and gives you a goal to strive towards and achieve in your life.” Duley received moko to celebrate his graduation from a bachelor in Māori studies.

A large proportion of New Zealanders now have tattoos of some sort, and there is "growing acceptance ... as a means of cultural and individual expression."

In 2016 New Zealand politician Nanaia Mahuta received a moko kauae. When she became foreign minister in 2020, a writer said that her facial tattoo was inappropriate for a diplomat. There was much support for Mahuta, who said "there is an emerging awareness about the revitalisation of Māori culture and that facial moko is a positive aspect of that. We need to move away from moko being linked to gangs, because that is not what moko represent at all."

On 25 December 2021, Māori journalist Oriini Kaipara, who has a moko kauae, became the first person with traditional facial markings to host a primetime news programme on national television in New Zealand.

In 2022, Ariana Tikao published a book called Mokorua: Ngā kōrero mō tōku moko kauae: My story of moko kauae detailing her tā moko journey; her artist was Christine Harvey.

Use by non-Māori
Moreover, early Māori visitors to Europe, such as Moehanga in 1805, Hongi Hika in 1820 and Te Pēhi Kupe in 1826, all had full-face , as did several "Pākehā Māori," such as Barnet Burns. However, until relatively recently the art had little global impact.

To reconcile the demand for Māori designs in a culturally sensitive way, the  group promotes the use of the term , which has now gained wide acceptance:

... translates literally to mean—"skin writing." As opposed to moko which requires a process of consents, genealogy and historical information, kirituhi is merely a design with Māori flavour that can be applied anywhere, for any reason and on anyone...

Gallery

See also
 , preserved Māori heads
 , traditional male Samoan tattoo

References

Sources
 
 Jahnke, R. and H. T., "The politics of Māori image and design", Pukenga Korero (Raumati (Summer) 2003), vol. 7, no. 1, pp. 5–31.
 King, M., and Friedlander, M., (1992). Moko:  Māori Tattooing in the 20th Century. (2nd ed.) Auckland: David Bateman. 
 Nikora, L. W., Rua, M., and Te Awekotuku, Ng., "Wearing Moko: Māori Facial Marking in Today's World", in Thomas, N., Cole, A., and Douglas, B. (eds.), Tattoo. Bodies, Art and Exchange in the Pacific and the West, London: Reacktion Books, pp. 191–204.
 Robley, Maj-Gen H. G., (1896). Moko, or Maori Tattooing. digital edition from New Zealand Electronic Text Centre
 Te Awekotuku, Ngahuia, "Tā Moko: Māori Tattoo", in Goldie, (1997) exhibition catalogue, Auckland: Auckland City Art Gallery and David Bateman, pp. 108–114.
 Te Awekotuku, Ngahuia, "More than Skin Deep", in Barkan, E. and Bush, R. (eds.), Claiming the Stone: Naming the Bones: Cultural Property and the Negotiation of National and Ethnic Identity (2002) Los Angeles: Getty Press, pp. 243–254.

External links

 Museum of New Zealand Te Papa Tongarewa Online Resources on Moko
 Images relating to moko from the collection of the Museum of New Zealand Te Papa Tongarewa
 New Zealand Electronic Text Centre collection on Ta Moko, mokamokai, Horatio Robley and his art. A bibliography provides further links to other online resources.
 The rise of the Maori tribal tattoo, BBC News Magazine,  21 September 2012, Ngahuia Te Awekotuku, University of Waikato, New Zealand

Māori art
Māori culture
Māori words and phrases
Polynesian tattooing
Tattoo designs